Coleophora mausolella is a moth of the family Coleophoridae. It is found in Spain, Portugal, France, Italy, Sardinia, Corsica, Sicily, Greece, Cyprus, Morocco, Libya, the Palestinian Territories, Turkmenistan, Turkey and the United Arab Emirates.

The larvae feed on Chenopodium species. They feed on the generative organs of their host plant.

References

mausolella
Moths described in 1908
Moths of Europe
Moths of Asia
Moths of Africa